Nantgaredig is a village in Carmarthenshire, Wales.
the Population was around 524 as of the 2011 census.

Notable people
The village is most notable for being the home of the actor Julian Lewis Jones. It is also the home of the former Welsh rugby union footballer Mefin Davies who plays as a hooker in the Wales national rugby union team.

The winner of the 1990 Cheltenham Gold Cup, Norton's Coin, was trained by Sirrel Griffiths at his farm at Nantgaredig.

References

External links
 

Villages in Carmarthenshire